Sabogal River is a river of Costa Rica. It is one of the main tributaries of the Frio River.

References

Rivers of Costa Rica